The men's 1 metre springboard competition of the diving events at the 2011 World Aquatics Championships was held on July 16 (preliminary round) and 18 (final).

Medalists

Results
The preliminary round was held on July 16 at 10:00 local time. The final was held on July 18 at 14:00.

Green denotes finalists

References

External links
2011 World Aquatics Championships: Men's 1 m springboard start list, from OmegaTiming.com; retrieved 2011-07-15.

Men's 1 m springboard